Dr. Who & the Daleks is a soundtrack album of music from the two Dalek films based on the BBC television series Doctor Who.  It includes music from Dr. Who and the Daleks by Malcolm Lockyer, and Daleks' Invasion Earth 2150 A.D. by Bill McGuffie. It was reissued 16 April 2016 as a yellow double vinyl LP, limited to 1500 copies, released for Record Store Day.

Track listing

Record Store Day EP
As part of Record Store Day 2011, a limited edition 7-inch EP of selected tracks was released on 16 April 2011

Track listing

Side one
Main Theme (Lockyer)
The Mountain (Lockyer)

Side two
Daleks' Invasion Earth 2150 A.D.

A mini-adventure edited from the film soundtrack featuring the voices of Peter Cushing and Bernard Cribbins with music by Bill McGuffie.

References

Doctor Who soundtracks
2009 soundtrack albums
Silva Screen Records soundtracks